Evie Peck is an actress and producer who has guest starred in several popular television shows such as Friends and Buffy the Vampire Slayer. She produced and starred in the independent film Memron in 2004. Evie was a member of Tim Robbins' Theater Company, The Actors' Gang, for over a decade. She has performed in many live shows with Tenacious D as well as in the Tenacious D feature film, The Pick of Destiny. She lives in Los Angeles, California.

External links

Living people
American television actresses
Year of birth missing (living people)
Place of birth missing (living people)
21st-century American women